Lac-Croche is an unorganized territory in the Capitale-Nationale region of Quebec, Canada, in the north of La Jacques-Cartier Regional County Municipality, taking up more than 50% of this regional county. It is unpopulated and undeveloped, almost entirely part of the Laurentides Wildlife Reserve.

It is named after Lake Croche, roughly located in the centre of the territory.

Demographics

Population

Private dwellings occupied by usual residents: 0 (total dwellings: 0)

See also
List of unorganized territories in Quebec

References

Unorganized territories in Capitale-Nationale